Seaside Park, aka Seaside, was a cannery town on the South Coast of British Columbia, Canada, located near Langdale and Port Mellon on the west, mainland side of Thornbrough Channel, a side-channel of Howe Sound separating Gambier Island from the mainland Sunshine Coast. Another cannery town nearby was Longview, just to the north along the same coastline.

See also
List of canneries in British Columbia

References
BCGNIS listing "Seaside Park" (locality)
 Time Traveling - Coastal Canneries of B.C., 1870 website

Sunshine Coast (British Columbia)
Company towns in Canada
Ghost towns in British Columbia
Unincorporated settlements in British Columbia